Tabarak-e Olya (also Romanized as Ţabarak-e ‘Olyā; also known as Tabarak-e Bālā) is a village in Bazoft Rural District, Bazoft District, Kuhrang County, Chaharmahal and Bakhtiari Province, Iran. At the 2006 census, its population was 182 in 32 families. The village is populated by Lurs.

References 

Populated places in Kuhrang County
Luri settlements in Chaharmahal and Bakhtiari Province